Luis Wilfredo Rivas  (born August 30, 1979) is a former Major League Baseball infielder. He played for the Minnesota Twins from 2000 to 2005, Cleveland Indians in 2007, and Pittsburgh Pirates in 2008. He batted and throws right-handed.

Rivas was known to be a free-swinging hitter who will offer at almost any pitch often putting it in play. As a runner, he has good speed and is aggressive on the basepaths. Defensively, Rivas has soft hands, a great arm and good range. He turns the double play well, and also is competent going back on pop-ups.

From 2000 to 2004, Rivas posted a .262 batting average with 29 home runs and 165 RBI in 506 games. After the 2005 All-Star break, Minnesota optioned Rivas to Triple-A Rochester. Once thought of as the Twins second baseman of the future, Rivas was yet to develop into the type of consistent hitter needed. He was recalled, and then again sent back down on October 4 after the season had ended.

In 2006, Rivas played for the Durham Bulls of the International League. He hit a disappointing .218 with an OPS of .540. He signed a Minor League contract with the Cleveland Indians for the 2007 season. He hit .263 for the Triple-A Buffalo Bisons in 105 games. He earned a big league callup on September 1, when rosters expanded. In December 2007, Rivas signed a minor league contract with the Pittsburgh Pirates.

In January 2009, Rivas signed a minor league contract with the Chicago Cubs.

See also
 List of Major League Baseball players from Venezuela

Sources
The ESPN Baseball Encyclopedia – Gary Gillette, Peter Gammons, Pete Palmer. Publisher: Sterling Publishing, 2005. Format: Paperback, 1824pp. Language: English.

External links
, or Retrosheet, or Venezuelan Winter League

1979 births
Living people
Buffalo Bisons (minor league) players
Cleveland Indians players
Durham Bulls players
Fort Myers Miracle players
Fort Wayne Wizards players
Gulf Coast Twins players
Iowa Cubs players
Major League Baseball players from Venezuela
Major League Baseball second basemen
Minnesota Twins players
Navegantes del Magallanes players
New Britain Rock Cats players
People from La Guaira
Pittsburgh Pirates players
Rochester Red Wings players
Salt Lake Buzz players
Venezuelan expatriate baseball players in the United States